Rafał Leszczyński may refer to:

Rafał Leszczyński (bishop of Płock), served 1523 to 1527 as diocesan bishop of Płock
Rafał Leszczyński (1526–1592), sejm marshal, voivode of the Brześć Kujawski, supporter of the "executionist movement" and Reformation
Rafał Leszczyński (1579–1636), voivode of Kalisz and Belz, one of the leaders of the "executionist movement" (ruch egzekucyjny)
Rafał Leszczyński (1650–1703), father of King of Poland Stanisław I Leszczyński
Rafał Leszczyński (footballer) (born 1992), Polish goalkeeper